Keanu Marqheal Marsh-Brown (born 10 August 1992) is a professional footballer who currently plays as a winger for Kuching City. Born in England, he represents Guyana internationally.

Club career

Fulham
Marsh-Brown graduated through the Fulham Academy to sign professional forms in summer 2009. He was on the bench for a number of Fulham's key knock-out games during their run to the 2010 UEFA Europa League Final, including those against Shakhtar Donetsk and Juventus, but he remained on the bench on each occasion. In November 2010, there were reports that both Tottenham Hotspur and Manchester City were considering making £500,000 offers for the player. In January 2011, Marsh-Brown signed an extension to his contract, keeping him at the club until June 2013. Later that month he joined League One side Milton Keynes Dons on a one-month loan deal. Impressing the Dons, his loan spell was extended to the end of the season. He made his senior debut on 2 February 2011, replacing Lewis Guy 68 minutes into a 2–1 win at Bristol Rovers. Three days later he got his second start, in a 2–2 draw with Sheffield Wednesday at Hillsborough. On 12 February, he scored his first senior goal, earning the Dons a 1–1 draw at home to Brentford. On 30 August 2011, Marsh-Brown signed on loan for Dundee United until mid January 2012, with the option to extend the deal until the end of the 2011–12 season. He joined his Fulham teammate Lauri Dalla Valle at Dundee United, who have links with Fulham via their reserve team coach, ex-United player Billy McKinlay. After only one appearance he returned to Fulham. In November 2011, Marsh-Brown left Fulham by mutual consent.

Oldham Athletic
After a two-week trial, Marsh-Brown joined League One side Oldham Athletic on 30 January 2012 on a deal to the end of the season, with an option to extend for a further season. Oldham manager Paul Dickov said: "I saw a lot of Keanu last season and he looked one of the best players in our division. The boy has bags and bags of ability, as well as raw pace, and he is a signing who excites me having followed his career for a long time."

He made his club debut the same day as a substitute in a Football League Trophy match against Chesterfield. He scored his first goal for Oldham in a 1–1 draw against Colchester United on 28 February. Marsh-Brown received a red card for a two-footed tackle in a 2–1 loss against Scunthorpe United on 6 March.

Yeovil Town
On 29 May 2012, Marsh-Brown joined League One side Yeovil Town following his release from Oldham Athletic and signed a one-year deal.

He scored in Yeovil's 3–0 win over Colchester United in the League Cup on 14 August 2012 and got the opening goal against Scunthorpe on 25 August 2012 in a 4–0 win for Yeovil.

On 25 January 2013, having fallen out of favour at Yeovil Town the club and Marsh-Brown agreed to cancel his contract by mutual agreement.

Barnet
Marsh-Brown joined Barnet on 28 March 2013 until the end of the season. He scored the winner on his debut against AFC Wimbledon on 1 April 2013. In June 2013, he signed with Barnet for the 2013–14 season. After 13 goals for the Bees in 2013–14, Marsh-Brown was transfer-listed to raise funds. Manager Martin Allen said: "As a club we need to increase the funds in the budget, I have explained this to Keanu and he can, without a shadow of a doubt, go on to play in League One and win games".

Marsh-Brown fell out of favour in the 2014–15 season, with Mauro Vilhete, Lee Cook, Luisma and Adam Mekki all preferred by Martin Allen. Bids from Blackpool and Luton Town on transfer deadline day were rejected by the club, while the player himself turned down a move to Forest Green Rovers. He had a trial Peterborough United in November 2014.

Marsh-Brown made just 11 appearances in all competitions in the 2014–15 season. Notably, he was not given a league winner's medal at the end of the season, unlike other players who had made fewer appearances. In June 2015, the Bees took up an option to extend Marsh-Brown's contract.

Forest Green Rovers
Marsh-Brown joined Forest Green on trial in June 2015, and later signed on a two-year deal for an undisclosed fee. He made his debut on the first day of the 2015–16 season in a 1–0 away win over Altrincham.

He helped the club reach the 2015–16 National League play-offs, and scored the semi-final winning goal against Dover Athletic on 7 May 2016 that helped the club reach the play-off final. He played the full 90 minutes in the play-off final at Wembley Stadium on 15 May 2016, scoring with a long-range strike, but could not prevent the club missing out on promotion to the Football League in a 3–1 loss to Grimsby Town.

The following 2016-17 National League season saw him play again at Wembley Stadium with Forest Green for the play-off final which this time saw a 3–1 win over Tranmere Rovers earn the club a first ever promotion to the Football League.

At the end of the 2017–18 season, Forest Green announced that Marsh-Brown would be one of the players that would not be offered a new contract at the club.

Dover Athletic (loan)
Marsh-Brown joined National League team Dover Athletic on loan from Forest Green in March 2018. He scored twice on his debut at home against leaders Macclesfield Town as Dover won 2–0. He was used mainly as a substitute for the rest of the season making just one more start the following week away at Barrow. He scored late on in the final day away at Woking as Dover won 2–1, relegating Woking but finishing outside of the play-offs on goal difference.

Newport County
On 22 June 2018 Marsh-Brown joined Newport County on a two-year deal. He made his debut for Newport on 4 August 2018 in a 3-0 League Two defeat against Mansfield Town. On 30 March 2019 he scored his first goal for Newport in the 3-1 League Two win against Yeovil Town. He was part of the team that reached the League Two playoff final at Wembley Stadium on 25 May 2019. Newport lost to Tranmere Rovers, 1-0 after a goal in the 119th minute.

His contract at Newport was terminated by mutual consent on 23 December 2019.

Memphis 901 FC
On 17 January 2020, USL Championship side Memphis 901 FC announced his signature.

Gloucester City

On 22 December 2020, Marsh-Brown joined National League North side Gloucester City.

Wrexham
On 10 April 2021, Marsh-Brown joined Wrexham on a non-contract basis, one of three signings that day. He made three appearances for the Welsh club before the end of the season. He was not offered a contract, but was invited back to pre-season training in summer 2021.

East Riffa
Marsh-Brown signed for Bahraini Premier League club East Riffa in September 2021.

In February 2022, Marsh-Brown joined Malaysia Premier League side Kuching City.

International career
Marsh-Brown has 4 caps for England U16 and 11 caps for England U17. He was called up to the England C squad for a friendly against a Latvia U-23 team on 10 September 2013, and played the entire game, which England lost 1–0. He was capped six times between 2013 and 2016.

In March 2015, Marsh-Brown was called up to the Antigua and Barbuda squad for a training camp ahead of 2018 FIFA World Cup qualification, alongside younger brother Kyjuon.

In March 2019 he was called up to the Guyana squad alongside his older brother Ronayne Marsh-Brown. He made his international debut for Guyana on 23 March 2019 against Belize and claimed an assist for the second goal in the 2–1 win.

Personal life
Marsh-Brown has three brothers, Kwai, Ky, and Ronayne Marsh-Brown, who are all footballers. His older brother Ronayne also represents the Guyana national team.

Career statistics

Club

International

International goals
Scores and results list Guyana's goal tally first.

References

External links

1992 births
Living people
Footballers from Hammersmith
Citizens of Guyana through descent
Guyanese footballers
Guyana international footballers
2019 CONCACAF Gold Cup players
English footballers
England youth international footballers
England semi-pro international footballers
Guyanese people of Antigua and Barbuda descent
English people of Guyanese descent
Sportspeople of Guyanese descent
English sportspeople of Antigua and Barbuda descent
Association football midfielders
Arsenal F.C. players
Fulham F.C. players
Milton Keynes Dons F.C. players
Dundee United F.C. players
Oldham Athletic A.F.C. players
Yeovil Town F.C. players
Barnet F.C. players
Forest Green Rovers F.C. players
English Football League players
National League (English football) players
Scottish Premier League players
USL Championship players
Bahraini Premier League players
Dover Athletic F.C. players
Newport County A.F.C. players
Memphis 901 FC players
Gloucester City A.F.C. players
Wrexham A.F.C. players
East Riffa Club players
Kuching City F.C. players
Expatriate soccer players in the United States
Expatriate footballers in Bahrain
English expatriate sportspeople in Bahrain
Expatriate footballers in Malaysia
English expatriate sportspeople in Malaysia